Paramelitidae is a family of amphipods, containing the following genera:
Antipodeus Williams & Barnard, 1988
Aquadulcaris Stewart & Griffiths, 1995
Austrocrangonyx Barnard & Barnard, 1983
Austrogammarus Barnard & Karaman, 1983
Chydaekata Bradbury, 2000
Giniphargus Karaman & Barnard, 1979
Hurleya Straskraba, 1966
Kruptus Finston, Johnson & Knott, 2008
Mathamelita Stewart & Griffiths, 1995
Molina Bradbury, 2000
Paramelita Schellenberg, 1926
Pilbarus Bradbury & Williams, 1997
Protocrangonyx Nicholls, 1927
Totgammarus Bradbury & Williams, 1995
Toulrabia Barnard & Williams, 1995
Uroctena Nicholls, 1926

References

Gammaridea
Crustacean families